Matthew Toby Perkins (born 12 August 1970) is a British Labour Party politician who has served as Member of Parliament (MP) for Chesterfield since 2010. He has been Shadow Minister for Apprentices and Lifelong Learning since April 2020. Previously he was Shadow Minister for Small Business under Ed Miliband and Shadow Minister for the Armed Forces under Jeremy Corbyn.

Early life and career 
Perkins was born in Reading on 12 August 1970. He is the son of V. F. Perkins and his wife Teresa. He has a sister, Polly. He is a great-grandson of A. P. Herbert, Independent Member of Parliament for Oxford University (1935–1950) and a grandson of the poet John Pudney. Perkins attended Trinity Catholic School in Leamington Spa, and Silverdale Comprehensive School in Sheffield.

He worked in the private sector from 1987 until elected to Parliament in 2010. He was in IT Sales: consultant and Regional Manager for the Prime Time Recruitment organisation, and subsequently set up a rugby product business.

Perkins was a councillor for Rother Ward on Chesterfield Borough Council from 2003 to 2011.

He was a Director of Families First Co-operative, a social enterprise that ran an early years nursery in Chesterfield, and set up the Chesterfield Flood Victims Appeal, which raised over £13,000 for victims of the floods in Chesterfield in 2007.

Parliamentary career 
Perkins' defeat of Chesterfield's sitting Liberal Democrat MP, Paul Holmes, in 2010 saw him overturn a majority of 3,000 to win by 549 votes, despite a national swing against the Labour Party. Perkins was largely elected owing to retention of the existing Labour vote, as there was a 7.5% swing towards the Conservative Party in the constituency with Labour making a net gain of 61 votes in comparison to 2005.

Following Perkins' election to Parliament in 2010, he asked a question in David Cameron's first post-election Prime Minister's Questions in the 2010 session and was named by the Financial Times as one of the best six newcomers of the first 100 days of the 2010 parliament.

He backed David Miliband for the Labour leadership. Under Ed Miliband, Perkins became the first of the 2010 intake of new members to speak from the front bench when becoming a Shadow Education Minister in September 2010 under Andy Burnham. He was moved into the Shadow Business team as Shadow Minister for Enterprise and Small Business in 2011, under Chuka Umunna. As Shadow Business Minister he was responsible for Labour's policies on Access to Finance, Small Businesses, Regulation/ de-regulation, Insolvency, Procurement, Pubs and the High Street.

He was elected to the Communities and Local Government Select Committee.

In July 2014, Douglas Alexander appointed Perkins one of three Labour Party Deputy Chairs for the 2015 general election campaign, alongside Gloria De Piero and Jonathan Ashworth. He had previously run Labour's by-election campaign in Wythenshawe and Sale East. He also worked on by-election campaigns in Corby, Bradford West and Eastleigh.

Perkins belongs to Labour Friends of Israel and Labour Friends of Palestine & the Middle East. He is the current chair of the All Party Parliamentary Pub Group, the All Party Parliamentary group on Tennis and was chair of the Labour Friends of the Forces from January 2016 to October 2020.

In parliament he has led Opposition Day debates for Labour on pub company regulation, Sunday trading laws for the Olympics, on the Deregulation Bill alongside Chi Onwurah. He has secured adjournment debates against Derbyshire fire station closures, which led to a U-turn on plans to close 18 Derbyshire fire stations, and against the sale of legal highs.

Perkins proposed in 2016, via a 10-minute private members' bill, that "God Save the Queen" should cease to be the anthem used by English teams at international sporting fixtures. The second reading was due for 4 March, but was cancelled.

Perkins was Shadow Minister for the Armed Forces in the Shadow Cabinet of Jeremy Corbyn. However, he resigned on 27 June 2016, along with many of his colleagues. He then supported Owen Smith in the failed attempt to replace Jeremy Corbyn in the 2016 Labour Party leadership election. He nominated Keir Starmer in the 2020 Labour Party leadership contest.

He campaigned for the UK to remain a member of the European Union ahead of the EU Referendum on 23 June 2016.

In October 2016, Perkins supported the Saudi Arabian–led intervention in Yemen against the Shia Houthis.

In April 2020, Perkins was appointed as Shadow Minister for Apprenticeships and Lifelong Learning by new party leader Keir Starmer.

Personal life 
Perkins was diagnosed with COVID-19 in December 2020. He was married in 1996 and separated in 2018, after it was revealed he had been having an affair with his aide, Amanda Collumbine, whom he has lived with in Chesterfield, Derbyshire since January 2019.

References

External links 
 Official website
 
 His page on the Labour Party UK website
 Chesterfield Borough Council Councillor Details
 Electoral history and profile at The Guardian
 

1970 births
Living people
Councillors in Derbyshire
Labour Party (UK) MPs for English constituencies
Labour Friends of Israel
People from Chesterfield, Derbyshire
UK MPs 2010–2015
UK MPs 2015–2017
UK MPs 2017–2019
UK MPs 2019–present
People educated at Silverdale School, Sheffield